Poste Maroc is the company responsible for postal service in Morocco.

References

External links 
Official website

See also
 ONPT, Office National des Postes et Télécommunications (Morocco)

Communications in Morocco
Logistics companies of Morocco
Morocco
Philately of Morocco
Government-owned companies of Morocco